Huang Zhongming (born 8 April 1982) is a male Chinese rower. He competed for Team China at the 2008 Summer Olympics. "Ming" used to coach at the Gorge Rowing and Paddling center in Victoria, BC. In the spring of 2011 he moved back to China. He is listed twice on the FISA database; once as a rower and once as a coach. Born in Guangzhou, Guangdong.

Major performances
2002/2003 National Spring Championships – 1st lightweight pairs;
2006 World Championships – 1st lightweight fours;
2007/2008 World Cup Leg 1 – 1st lightweight fours;
2007 World Championships – 5th lightweight fours

References

1982 births
Living people
Chinese male rowers
Olympic rowers of China
Sportspeople from Guangzhou
Rowers at the 2008 Summer Olympics
World Rowing Championships medalists for China
Rowers from Guangdong
20th-century Chinese people
21st-century Chinese people